Thurston may refer to:

Places

Antarctica
Thurston Glacier, Marie Byrd Land, Antarctica
Thurston Island, off Ellsworth Land, Antarctica

United Kingdom
Thurston, Suffolk, England, a village
Thurston railway station
Thurston's Hall, a former snooker and billiards venue in London
Thurston End, a hamlet in Hawkedon parish

United States
Thurston County, Nebraska
Thurston, Nebraska, a village
Thurston, New York, a town
Thurston, Ohio, a village
Thurston, Oregon (disambiguation), several places
Thurston, Virginia, an unincorporated community
Thurston County, Washington

People
Thurston (name), a list of people with this given name or surname

Other uses
Thurston Gardens, botanical gardens in Suva, Fiji
Thurston Elementary School, Ann Arbor, Michigan
Thurston High School, Springfield, Oregon
Thurston House (disambiguation), several houses on the US National Register of Historic Places
USS Thurston (AP-77), a World War II troop transport

See also
Thurstone
Thurstaston
Thurstan